Omoglymmius largus is a species of beetle in the subfamily Rhysodidae. It was described by R.T. Bell and J.R. Bell in 1985. It is known from the Fly River, New Guinea.

Omoglymmius largus holotype, a female, measures  in length.

Notes

References

largus
Beetles of Oceania
Insects of New Guinea
Endemic fauna of New Guinea
Beetles described in 1985